Caracal International LLC is a small arms company headquartered in Abu Dhabi in the United Arab Emirates, responsible for producing a variety of small arms for use by civilians, professional law enforcement and military operators. 

It is a subsidiary of EDGE Group.

History

In 2002, Caracal designers and experts working in conjunction with the United Arab Emirates Armed Forces started the development of a range of modern pistols and accessories.

By the end of 2006, Caracal International L.L.C. was incorporated and registered as a company in Abu Dhabi. With that, the foundation of a pistol manufacturing industry was established for the first time in the GCC.

Products

Pistols
 Caracal pistol

Submachine Guns
 CMP 9

Assault Rifles
 Caracal CAR 814
 Caracal CAR 816
 Caracal CAR 817AR

Sniper Rifles
 Caracal CS308
 Caracal CS338
 Caracal CAR 817DMR
 Caracal CSR 50

References

Manufacturing companies based in Abu Dhabi
Manufacturing companies established in 2007
Defence companies of the United Arab Emirates
2007 establishments in the United Arab Emirates